Grant Medical Center was established in 1900 in downtown Columbus, Ohio as the second member hospital of OhioHealth, a not-for-profit, faith-based healthcare system. Grant Medical Center is a Level I Trauma Center.

According to U.S. News & World Report; Regionally Ranked Grant Medical Center #16 in Ohio and nearly at the level of nationally ranked U.S. News Best Hospitals in 3 adult specialties. OhioHealth Grant Medical Center is also recognized as a teaching hospital.

The hospital replaced St. Francis Hospital, also known as Starling Medical College. Grant Medical Center operated a 16-story building, Baldwin Tower, from 1968 to its demolition in 2004.

Services and clinical programs

Trauma care
Grant Medical Center has a Level I Trauma Center in Columbus having been verified as such in 1993.

Surgery
Grant Medical Center performed 8,110 annual inpatient and 12,617 outpatient surgeries according to U.S. News & World Report. Grant Medical Center is also a teaching hospital offering Surgical Critical Care Fellowships.

Neurosciences
Grant Medical Center is certified by The Joint Commission as a Primary Stroke Center.

Grant Medical Center received the American Stroke Association award Get with the Guidelines® Achievement Award in 2014 and 2016

Orthopedics
Grant Medical Center is an accredited hospital from The Joint Commission, and has been since 2010. The Joint Commission Quality Check specifically recognizes Grant Medical Center for its ability in Joint Replacement - Shoulder, Joint Replacement - Knee, Joint Replacement - Hip, and Hip Fracture treatments.

History

References

External links
 

Hospitals in Columbus, Ohio
Buildings in downtown Columbus, Ohio
Companies based in the Columbus, Ohio metropolitan area
Hospital networks in the United States
Medical and health organizations based in Ohio
Level 1 trauma centers
Trauma centers